The Broad Band X-ray Telescope (BBXRT) was flown on the Space Shuttle Columbia (STS-35) from December 2 through December 11, 1990 as part of the ASTRO-1 payload. The flight of BBXRT marked the first opportunity for performing X-ray observations over a broad energy range (0.3-12 keV) with a moderate energy resolution (typically 90 eV and 150 eV at 1 and 6 keV, respectively).

BBXRT was co-mounted with three ultraviolet telescopes HUT, WUPPE, and HIT for Astro-1 in 1990.

This was, "..the first focusing X-ray telescope operating over a broad energy range 0.3-12 keV with a moderate energy resolution (90 eV at 1 keV and 150eV at 6 keV)." according to NASA.

Hardware

See also
Spacelab
X-ray astronomy
List of X-ray space telescopes

References

External links
Broad Band X-ray Telescope (BBXRT. GSFC. NASA) on the internet

Space telescopes
X-ray telescopes
Crewed space observatories
Space Shuttle program